Milton Township is one of the sixteen townships of Wayne County, Ohio, United States.  The 2000 census found 9,254 people in the township, 3,053 of whom lived in the unincorporated portions of the township.

Geography
Located in the northern part of the county, it borders the following townships:
Guilford Township, Medina County - north
Wadsworth Township, Medina County - northeast
Chippewa Township - east
Baughman Township - southeast corner
Green Township - south
Wayne Township - southwest corner
Canaan Township - west
Westfield Township, Medina County - northwest corner

Most of the city of Rittman is located in northeastern Milton Township, and the unincorporated community of Sterling lies in the northwestern part of the township.

Name and history
It is one of five Milton Townships statewide.

Government
The township is governed by a three-member board of trustees, who are elected in November of odd-numbered years to a four-year term beginning on the following January 1. Two are elected in the year after the presidential election and one is elected in the year before it. There is also an elected township fiscal officer, who serves a four-year term beginning on April 1 of the year after the election, which is held in November of the year before the presidential election. Vacancies in the fiscal officership or on the board of trustees are filled by the remaining trustees.

References

External links
Wayne County township map
County website

Townships in Wayne County, Ohio
Townships in Ohio